HMS Carnation was a Royal Navy 18-gun  built by Taylor at Bideford and launched in 1807. After the French brig Palinure captured her, she was burned by the French to prevent her recapture.

Career
Carnation entered service at Plymouth in 1807 under Commander Charles Mars Gregory, who sailed her to the West Indies in 1808. Gregory and all his officers were killed or wounded in the opening exchanges and Palinure′s crew attempted to board. Carnation′s crew were mustered to resist, but a Royal Marine sergeant named John Chapman refused the order and led over 30 men below decks to await capture. The remaining crewmen were outnumbered and had to surrender.

Carnation had lost 10 killed and 30 wounded, perhaps half mortally; the French lost about 15 men killed and wounded. The French then took Carnation to Marin Bay, Martinique.

The French commissioned Carnation on 31 January 1809 under the command of  Ensign de vaisseau Simon-Auguste Huguet. Huguet had distinguished himself in the engagement as Palinure's Capitaine de frègate Pierre-François Jance had been debilitated by yellow fever and reportedly died within an hour of the victory after transferring to Carnation, which was the better vessel.

Fate

During the invasion of Martinique in January 1809, British troops landed close to where she was berthed. On 31 January 1809 her crew set Carnation on fire, destroying her.

Postscript

The British arrested Chapman and 31 of the crew who had deserted the deck during the battle. A court martial convicted them of cowardice; Chapman was hanged from the yardarm of  the day after his sentence was passed. The others were sentenced to floggings and transportation as convicts to Botany Bay for 14 years, though it is not clear this part of their sentence was ever carried out. One man was acquitted.

On 31 October 1808, the frigate  encountered Palinure near Diamond Rock. A short engagement followed in which Circe captured Palinure. She had lost seven killed and eight wounded; Circe had lost one man killed and one wounded. The British took Palinure into service as HMS Snap.

Citations, and references

Citations

References
 
 Gossett, William Patrick (1986) The lost ships of the Royal Navy, 1793-1900. (London:Mansell). 
 Hepper, David J. (1994) British Warship Losses in the Age of Sail, 1650-1859. (Rotherfield: Jean Boudriot). 
 
 Michael Phillips' "Ships of the Old Navy"
 Roche, Jean-Michel (2005) Dictionnaire des Bâtiments de la Flotte de Guerre Française de Colbert à nos Jours. (Group Retozel-Maury Millau).
 
 Winfield, Rif & Stephen S Roberts (2015) French Warships in the Age of Sail 1786 - 1861: Design Construction, Careers and Fates. (Seaforth Publishing). 

 

Cruizer-class brig-sloops
Ships built in Devon
Brigs of the French Navy
1807 ships
Maritime incidents in 1809
Captured ships
Shipwrecks in the Caribbean Sea
Ship fires